Miguel Angel Moreno (born 2 March 1977) is a Salvadoran judoka. He competed in the men's half-lightweight event at the 2000 Summer Olympics.

References

1977 births
Living people
Salvadoran male judoka
Olympic judoka of El Salvador
Judoka at the 2000 Summer Olympics
Place of birth missing (living people)